Mizoram Football Association (MFA) is the state governing body of football in Mizoram, India. It is affiliated with the All India Football Federation, the national governing body. Mizoram football enthusiasts started Aizawl Sport Association in 1945. After 1972, the name was changed to Mizoram Sports Association. In 1973 under the guidance of Shri Lal Thanhawla, football started as a separate unit and took the name Mizoram Football Association. MFA was registered under society act in the year of 1980. MFA covers 8 regional districts. 

In 2012, led by Tetea Hmar as Honorary Secretary, who was also executive member of the All India Football Federation (AIFF), the association made a national success when it established the first domestic league, called the Mizoram Premier League (MPL), in India in 2012. MFA had no fund on its own or sponsor for the MPL, Hmar persuaded the local TV provider Zonet to join in the management. Zonet agreed a five-year deal as the sponsor with INR 2.5 million each year. The success of the league led to the Mizoram team winning the national championship Santosh Trophy for the first time in 2014.

Tournaments
MFA conducts the following tournaments:
 Mizoram Premier League
 Mizoram Futsal League
 Independence Day Cup
 MFA Super Cup
 MFA Cup
 Mizoram Women’s League
 Youth leagues

References

External links
 
Mizoram Football Association at the AIFF 

Football governing bodies in India
Football in Mizoram
Organisations based in Mizoram
1973 establishments in Mizoram
Sports organizations established in 1973